James Earl Steels (born May 30, 1961) is a former outfielder. He played for the San Diego Padres, Texas Rangers, and San Francisco Giants.
James is a resident of Santa Maria, California.

References

External links
, or Retrosheet
Pelota Binaria (Venezuelan Winter League)

1961 births
Living people
African-American baseball players
Amarillo Gold Sox players
American expatriate baseball players in Mexico
Beaumont Golden Gators players
Baseball players from Jackson, Mississippi
Buffalo Bisons (minor league) players
Cardenales de Lara players
American expatriate baseball players in Venezuela
Diablos Rojos del México players
Hawaii Islanders players
Indianapolis Indians players
Industriales de Monterrey players
Las Vegas Stars (baseball) players
Major League Baseball outfielders
Oklahoma City 89ers players
People from Bentonia, Mississippi
Phoenix Firebirds players
Reno Silver Sox players
San Diego Padres players
San Francisco Giants players
Texas Rangers players
21st-century African-American people
20th-century African-American sportspeople